Anna Brownell Jameson (17 May 179417 March 1860) was an Anglo-Irish art historian. Born in Ireland, she migrated to England at the age of four, becoming a well-known British writer and contributor to nineteenth-century thought on a range of subjects including early feminism, art history (particularly sacred art), travel, Shakespeare, poets, and German culture.  Jameson was connected to some of the most prominent names of the period including Fanny Kemble, Elizabeth Barrett-Browning and Robert Browning, Harriet Martineau, Ottilie von Goethe (the daughter-in-law of Goethe), Lady Byron, Charles and Elizabeth Eastlake, and Barbara Leigh Smith Bodichon.

Biography
Anna Murphy was born in Dublin, 17 May 1794. Her father, Denis Brownell Murphy (died 1842), was a miniaturist and enamel painter. He moved to England in 1798 with his wife Johanna and four daughters (of whom Anna was the eldest) and eventually settled at Hanwell, London.

At sixteen years of age, she became governess in the family of Charles Paulet, 13th Marquess of Winchester. In 1821 she was engaged to lawyer and later Upper Canada jurist Robert Jameson. The engagement was broken off, and Anna Murphy accompanied a young pupil to Italy, writing a "autobiographical" narrative under the guise of an unnamed and ailing young woman who eventually dies. She gave this diary to a bookseller on condition of receiving a guitar if he secured any profits. Colburn ultimately published it as The Diary of an Ennuyée (1826), which attracted much attention, not least because the identity of the writer was soon discovered creating a scandal among reviewers in particular who felt they had been duped.  For Anna however, it was the first taste of notoriety.  Anna Murphy was governess to the children of Edward Littleton, later created Baron Hatherton, from 1821 to 1825, when she relented and married Jameson.

The marriage proved unhappy. In 1829, when Jameson was appointed puisne judge in the island of Dominica, he left Anna in England (never sending for her during his time there despite repeated promises), and she visited Continental Europe again with her father. In that year she made her name when the Loves of the Poets was published. The book attracted a poem by Mrs. Cornwell Baron Wilson in tribute.

The first work which displayed her powers of original thought was her Characteristics of Women (1832).
These analyses of William Shakespeare's heroines are remarkable for their delicacy of critical insight and fineness of literary touch. 

German literature and art had aroused much interest in the United Kingdom of Great Britain and Ireland, and Jameson paid her first visit to the German Confederation in 1833. The conglomerations of hard lines, cold colours and pedantic subjects which decorated Munich under the patronage of King Ludwig I of Bavaria, were new to the world, and Jameson's enthusiasm first gave them an English reputation.

In 1836, Jameson was summoned to Canada by her husband, who had been appointed to the Court of Chancery of the province of Upper Canada. Jameson and her husband had already lived apart for over four years, during which Anna made a good living for herself as a writer. She made no secret of the fact that she was unhappy in her marriage. Upon her arrival, her husband failed to meet her at New York and she was left to make her way alone in winter to Toronto. Here she began the travelogue of her journey, Winter Studies and Summer Rambles in Canada, which was published in Britain in 1838. She writes in this book her initial distaste for Toronto in her first few months there, describing it as "ugly" and "inefficient." After eight months of travelling and writing in Canada, she felt it useless to prolong a life far from all ties of family happiness and opportunities for a woman of her class and education. Before leaving, she undertook a journey to the depths of the Indian settlements in Canada; she explored Lake Huron, and saw much of emigrant and aboriginal life unknown to colonial travellers. She returned to Great Britain in 1838.

At this period Jameson began making careful notes of the chief private art collections in and near London. The result appeared in her Companion to the Private Galleries (1842), followed in the same year by the Handbook to the Public Galleries. She edited the Memoirs of the Early Italian Painters in 1845. That same year she visited her friend Ottilie von Goethe. Her friendship with Annabella Byron, 11th Baroness Wentworth, dates from about this time and lasted for some seven years; it was brought to an end apparently through the Baroness's unreasonable temper.

A volume of essays published in 1846 contains one of Jameson's best pieces of work, The House of Titian. In 1847 she went to Italy with her niece and subsequent biographer (Memoirs, 1878), Gerardine Bate (later the wife of the noted photographer Robert Macpherson), to collect materials for the work on which her reputation rests: her series of Sacred and Legendary Art. The time was ripe for such contributions to the traveller's library. The Acta Sanctorum and the Book of the Golden Legend had had their readers, but no one had ever pointed out the connection between these tales and the works of Christian art. The way to these studies had been pointed out in the preface to Kugler's Handbook of Italian Painting by Sir Charles Eastlake, who had intended pursuing the subject himself.

Eventually he made over to Jameson the materials and references he had collected. She recognised the extent of the ground before her as a mingled sphere of poetry, history, devotion, and art. She infected her readers with her own enthusiastic admiration; and, in spite of her slight technical and historical equipment, Jameson produced a book which thoroughly deserved its great success.

She also took a keen interest in questions affecting the education, occupations, and maintenance of her own sex. Her early essay on The Relative Social Position of Mothers and Governesses was the work of one who knew both sides; and in no respect does she more clearly prove the falseness of the position she describes than in the certainty with which she predicts its eventual reform. To her we owe the first popular enunciation of the principle of male and female co-operation in works of mercy and education. In her later years she took up a succession of subjects all bearing on the same principles of active benevolence and the best ways of carrying them into practice. Sisters of charity, hospitals, penitentiaries, prisons, and workhouses all claimed her interest – all more or less included under those definitions of "the communion of love and communion of labour" which are inseparably connected with her memory. To the clear and temperate forms in which she brought the results of her convictions before her friends in the shape of private lectures (published as Sisters of Charity, 1855, and The Communion of Labour, 1856) may be traced the source whence later reformers and philanthropists took counsel and courage.

She left the last of her Sacred and Legendary Art series in preparation. It was completed as The History of Our Lord in Art, by Lady Eastlake.

References

Further reading
Judith Johnston, 'Anna Brownell Jameson and the Monthly Chronicle''', In Garlick & Harris , eds., Victorian Journalism: Exotic and Domestic (Queensland University Press, 1998)
Judith Johnston, 'Anna Jameson: Victorian, Feminist, Woman of Letters.' Aldershot: Scolar Press, 1997.
Gerardine Bate (Mrs. Robert) Macpherson, Memoirs of the Life of Anna Jameson (Boston, 1878)

Thomas, Clara. Love and Work Enough: The Life of Anna Jameson. Toronto: University of Toronto Press, 1967.
Jameson, Anna. (1832). Characteristics of Women: Moral, Poetical, and Historical. Saunders and Otley (reissued by Cambridge University Press, 2009)
Jameson, Anna. (1838). Winter Studies and Summer Rambles in Canada.'' 3 vols. London: Saunders and Otley.

External links

 Biography at the Dictionary of Canadian Biography Online
 Works by Mrs. Jameson at Open Library
 Different sides of the picture. Four Women's Views of Canada (1816 - 1838). Submitted in partial fulfilment of the requirements for the degree of Doctor of Philosophy, by Susan Birkwood, Faculty of Graduate Studies, The University of Western Ontario, London, Ontario, 1997 (Ann Cuthbert Knight; Jameson; Frances Trollope; Frances Wright)

Electronic editions
 
 
 

1794 births
1860 deaths
19th-century British women writers
19th-century British writers
British art historians
Irish governesses
Burials at Kensal Green Cemetery
People from Hanwell
Writers from London
19th-century Anglo-Irish people